Mohammed Ziauddin Rizvi is one of the prominent Samajwadi leaders of Uttar Pradesh. He is the Member of Legislative Assembly from Sikanderpur, Uttar Pradesh. He is in panchayti raaj adhyaksh (rajya mantri) in present Samajwadi Party Government of Uttar Pradesh. Presently, it is his second term as MLA from Sikanderpur constituency. He is one of the oldest Samajwadi leaders from eastern U.P.

Personal details
Mohammed Ziauddin Rizvi, better known as "Vidhayak Ji" due to his prominence in locality, was born at a small village named Siwankala near Sikanderpur. He entered politics at an early age and was close to Samajwadi Party (not recognised then) head Mulayam Singh Yadav since inception.

References

Year of birth missing (living people)
Living people
Samajwadi Party politicians
Uttar Pradesh MLAs 2012–2017
Uttar Pradesh MLAs 2022–2027
Samajwadi Party politicians from Uttar Pradesh